Philautus umbra (common names:  pinnacle bush frog, pinnacle bubble-nest frog) is a species of frog in the family Rhacophoridae. It is endemic to Borneo and only known from Mount Api in northern Sarawak, Malaysia, although it might also occur in the adjacent Brunei.

Description
Philautus umbra is a relatively large Philautus species, reaching  snout–vent length. During the day, these frogs are almost uniformly blackish above, whereas during the night the colouration lightens up to light grey. Fingers are long with broad adhesive disks.

Habitat and conservation
Males have been observed calling from near the ground up to 2 metres above the ground. There are no known threats to this species residing with the Gunung Mulu National Park, but its restricted range has led to its listing as "Vulnerable" by the International Union for Conservation of Nature (IUCN).

References

umbra
Endemic fauna of Borneo
Endemic fauna of Malaysia
Amphibians of Malaysia
Amphibians described in 1987
Taxonomy articles created by Polbot
Amphibians of Borneo